Towlers Bay is a locality in Ku-ring-gai Chase National Park, north of the city of Sydney, New South Wales, Australia, situated on the Northern Beaches. The bay located there, formerly of the same name, was renamed Morning Bay on 31 August 1984.  It had been named after Bill Toler, who used to camp in the area in the 19th century.

References

Bays of New South Wales